Myersophis is a genus of snake in the family Cyclocoridae. It contains only one species, Myersophis alpestris or Myers' mountain snake, which is endemic to the Philippines.

It is only known from two specimens collected near Banaue from Mountain Province in northern Luzon. Nothing else is known about this species, such as its habitat, and the holotype has since been lost.

A 2017 phylogenetic study found Myersophis to be the sister group to the genus Oxyrhabdium (both genera having diverged during the Oligocene), and assigned both, alongside some other Philippine endemic snake genera, to the new subfamily Cyclocorinae. Later studies uplifted Cyclocorinae to being its own family, Cyclocoridae.

References 
Cyclocoridae
Monotypic snake genera
Reptiles of the Philippines
Endemic fauna of the Philippines
Fauna of Luzon
Taxa named by Edward Harrison Taylor